Elizabeth Heng is an American politician. She unsuccessfully ran for election to the U.S. House of Representatives in 2018 and 2022. She also led a political action committee, known for running a graphic ad highlighting the Cambodian genocide during a  Democratic presidential primary debate.

Early life 
Both of Elizabeth Heng's parents are refugees from Cambodia. They lived through the Cambodian Civil War and left, arriving in the U.S. in 1983, giving birth to Heng shortly after. Heng's parents owned and operated a market in southeast Fresno for 25 years, and Heng worked there while attending the local Fresno public schools. Heng was the valedictorian of her 2003 class at Sunnyside High School. She earned her bachelor's degree in political science and American politics from Stanford University in 2007, where she also was elected student body president then returned to Fresno.

After starting a retail cell phone business with her brothers, Heng moved to Washington, D.C. without a job offer. In an interview in 2018, Heng said she "knocked on doors at Capitol Hill dropping off my resume," and ended up working for Republican Ed Royce, a U.S. Representative from Fullerton, California. She worked on Royce's campaign in 2012, worked as a staffer on the House Foreign Affairs Committee and also served on the Trump inaugural committee in 2016 before returning to Fresno in August 2017.

Politics

First U.S. House of Representatives Campaign 
On February 16, 2018, a campaign committee filed federal paperwork for Elizabeth Heng to run for the 16th congressional district, challenging longtime incumbent Democrat Jim Costa. Heng was relatively unknown at the time, with the chair of the local Democratic Party calling her a "mystery." However, she gained notoriety for aggressive attack ads, including one where she depicted a silver-haired man who resembled Costa walking on a sidewalk in red high heels, which prompted questions of sexism. Heng also ran an ad featuring images of the Cambodian genocide, part of her family heritage. This ad was banned on Facebook and Twitter, leading to conservative claims of social media bias and unjustified censorship. Both social media sites ended up reversing course and allowing the commercials.

Heng received comparisons to Alexandria Ocasio-Cortez, with some seeing parallels as a minority, millennial female running against an established male politician. However, Heng lost her general election race against Costa in November 2018, receiving 60,693 votes to Costa's 82,266.

New Faces GOP 
In March 2019, a political action committee (PAC) named "New Faces GOP" was formed, led by Heng. The PAC spent $96,000 to run a graphic ad during the third Democratic presidential primary debate in September 2019. The ad depicted Alexandria Ocasio-Cortez's face burning while Heng narrates, talking about her family's story escaping socialism in Cambodia and the Khmer Rouge regime. It appeared in three media markets: New York City, Washington D.C. and Fresno-Visalia, and it quickly drew criticism on social media.

Ocasio-Cortez reacted to the ad on her Twitter account, saying it is a "love letter" to "the GOP’s white supremacist(s)," while other Democrats directed their criticism at the network which ran the ad and caused the hashtag #BoycottABC to trend.

Second U.S. House of Representatives Campaign 
Heng planned on running in the 2022 United States Senate elections in California but withdrew and announced her intent to run for the U.S. House of Representatives seat vacated by Devin Nunes's resignation. She did not receive enough votes in the special primary election, held in April 2022, to advance. Connie Conway ultimately won the seat.

References 

1985 births
21st-century American politicians
Candidates in the 2018 United States elections
California Republicans
People from Fresno, California
Living people